Důras is a Czech surname. Notable people with the surname include:

 Michal Důras (born 1981), Czech hockey player
 Oldřich Duras (1882–1957), sometimes Důras, Czech chess master

Czech-language surnames